Ududeniya Sinhalagama is a village in  Central Province, Sri Lanka.

See also
List of towns in Central Province, Sri Lanka

External links

Populated places in Kandy District